Aamar Pratigya (  "My Promise") is a 2008 film Indian Bengali film directed by Swapan Saha. The film is an official remake of 2005 Tamil movie Sivakasi.

Cast
 Biswanath Basu
 Priyanshu Chatterjee
 Priyanka Trivedi 
 Paoli Dam
 Tathoi Deb
 Premjit Chatterjee 
 Surajit Sen 
 Rajatava Dutta
 Dulal Lahiri
 Subhasish Mukhopadhyay
 Laboni Sarkar

References

External links
  gomolo.in

2008 films
Bengali-language Indian films
2000s Bengali-language films
Films directed by Swapan Saha
Bengali remakes of Tamil films